Chris Trapper (born March 31, 1971 in Buffalo, New York) is an American songwriter and musician, best known as the singer and guitarist of the band The Push Stars. His song “This Time” appeared in August Rush.

Early life 
He is the youngest of 6 children in a working-class family from Buffalo, NY. Trapper relocated to Boston after college.

Career 
He formed The Push Stars with Dan McLoughlin and Ryan MacMillan in Boston. In 1999, the band released their Capitol Records debut “After The Party” and subsequently released two more records before going on hiatus in 2005.

Trapper embarked on a successful solo career, touring the globe and releasing nine full-length albums to date. Trapper's songs can be heard in other films including There’s Something About Mary, The Devil Wears Prada, Some Kind Of Beautiful.

His songs have appeared on television shows such as Pepper Dennis, ER, and Malcolm in the Middle. In 2018, The Push Stars released their first album in 14 years, 3 Feet In The Air, recorded at Ardent Studios in Memphis.

A constant live performer, Trapper has performed an average of 150 shows a year for more than a decade.

Recognition 

 Buffalo Music Hall of Fame (2018). 
 SOCAN songwriting award for his contribution to the album Sea of No Cares by Great Big Sea (2003).

Discography
Trappers albums include:

Cold Water Waltz (2020) 
 Under Blue Stars
 Clear
 Answer Me
 Back Home
 Love & Faith
 Party in the Parking Lot
 Grace Let Me In
 Out of the Limelight
 Make It Through
 Starlight Creek
 Cathedral Bells
 Light in Your Eyes
 Cold Water Waltz (Instrumental)

Symphonies of Dirt and Dust (2015) 
 Angel Appearing in a Small Cafe
 Everything Was Possible
 If You're Still There
 Best in Me
 Heart in the Sea
 Not the End of the World
 Symphonies of Dirt and Dust
 Into the Bright Lights
 Blind Leading the Blind
 Honest Man in California
 F#*k It
 Boston Strong

Technicolor (2013) 
 Extraordinary
 Northwest Sun
 Technicolor
 All of This and Everything
 I'll Count You
 West Side
 The Accident
 Ohio
 Bye Bye Beautiful
 God in Every Cloud
 Good Times
 Werewolf in Times Square
 Sober For a Living
 For the Wondering
 Waving as I Go
 Top of the Sky
 From the Ashes

The Few and The Far Between (2011) 
 Here All Along (featuring Rob Thomas)
 Long Goodbye
 The More I Think (featuring Colin Hay)
 Skin
 Ghost in Your Arms (featuring Kristin Cifelli)
 Easy Flyer
 Few and Far Between
 Still In Me
 Eyes Twice the Size
 Not Normal
 Search Inside
 Wake me With Your Kiss
 Lonesome Parade (for Phyllis Malloy & Juri Bunetta)
 Home

Gone Again (feat. The Wolverine Jazz Band) (2011) 
 All Time Favorite
 Gone Again
 Nowhere
 Jukebox Lights
 Away We Go
 Boston Girl
 Dinner and a Dream
 Kids to Chase
 Meant to Be
 Party At the Andersons
 Kiss You Where You Lay
 Keg On My Coffin (Live)

Into The Bright Lights [EP] (2010) 
 Family Tree
 The Game Is Done
 Into The Bright Lights
 Heartaches On Parade
 From The Balcony
 Already Gone
 Black Sky Blue

Til The Last Leaf Falls (2008) 
 This Time
 Wait a Lifetime
 Black Hearted Bride
 Cost of Constant Traveling
 In My Sight
 Look What the Wind Blew In
 Big Mistake
 Least You're Breathing
 Across the World
 Curbside View
 Black Eye
 Til the Last Leaf Falls
 Passing

Songs From the Middle of the World - Solo/Acoustic Rarities Vol.1 (2008) 
 Faded and Jaded
 A Day Without You
 $100 Man
 Living Downtown
 Letter to the Middle of the World
 These Mistakes
 Black Sky Blue
 Feel Like Staying Home
 The Losing End
 Falling Away
 Avalanche
 Mid-Summer Nights Kidnapping Case
 Hard Times
 Wrong Side of Town
 What Are You Gonna Do?
 Who Can Save Me
 Anywhere You Are

It's Christmas Time (2007) 
 It's Christmas Time
 Black and Blue Christmas
 Thorn Becomes a Rose
 Christmas Magic
 One Bright Star
 This December
 Wish It Was Christmas Day
 California Holiday
 Christmas Ends a Day Too Soon
 Mystified

Hey You (2006) 
 Feelings Without Weight
 Into the Wasteland
 Say It Loud
 In From the Outside
 See Something Fly
 Wish I Was Cool
 Forget Me
 35th Birthday
 Perfumed Hair
 Tear Choked Eye
 Yearning to be Burning
 Better Half
 Lonely Valentine
 Every Time I See You
 Weightless

Songs From the Drive-In (2002) 
 Time to Forgive
 Elvis Presley Boulevard
 Midnight Cabaret
 Summertime is Here
 House Next to the Drive-In
 Happy Where I Am
 Birthday Song
 Ever Since the Day
 Me and My Blue Water
 Starlight

References

External links
 Chris Trapper's Web Site
 The Push Stars Web Site

American rock singers
Living people
1971 births
21st-century American singers